Lanes Mill Creek is a stream in the U.S. state of Georgia. It is a tributary to Clyatt Mill Creek.

Lanes Mill Creek was named after Mills B. Lane III, a local landowner.

References

Rivers of Georgia (U.S. state)
Rivers of Lowndes County, Georgia